The 2006 Crown Royal 400, NASCAR's tenth race of the 2006 season was held at Richmond International Raceway on May 6, 2006. Greg Biffle won the pole. This was the second impound race of the 2006 season and Dale Earnhardt Jr.'s final win driving for Dale Earnhardt, Inc.  Earnhardt Jr. went win-less in 2007 before joining Hendrick Motorsports in 2008.

Qualifying

Race results
Rookie of the year contenders denoted by *

Failed to qualify: Kertus Davis (#89), Chad Chaffin (#34), Stanton Barrett (#95), Hermie Sadler (#00)

References

 Official results 

Crown Royal 400
Crown Royal 400
NASCAR races at Richmond Raceway
May 2006 sports events in the United States